Boomers! Parks is a chain of family entertainment centers which feature indoor activities such as carousels, kiddie swings, restaurants, and video game arcades, and outdoor activities such as miniature golf, kiddie rides, bumper boats, batting cages, go-karts, kiddie roller coasters, and laser tag. The Modesto and Irvine locations each have a ride called the Flamethrower.

The Boomers! Parks brand is a DBA name adopted in 2001 by the Palace Entertainment chain, which was founded in 1998 through the merger of Camelot Parks, Palace Park, Boomers!, Grand Prix Race-O-Rama, and Family Fun Center. The official slogan of Palace Entertainment owned Boomers! Parks is "Where Family Fun Rules!".

In September 2014, Apex Parks Group purchased 10 Boomers locations from Palace Entertainment. In 2015, Apex Parks Group rebranded one of the last Mountasia Family Fun Centers to a Boomers.  Closure of the Fresno and Houston locations in later years has resulted in 9 total Boomers parks currently owned by Apex Parks Group.

On April 8, 2020, Apex Parks Group announced it was filing for Chapter 11 bankruptcy and undergoing a financial restructuring.

On June 8, 2020, Boomers announced that they would be closing locations in El Cajon, California, Upland, California, and Kearny Mesa, California. The Fountain Valley, California location also has closed down.

After restructuring Apex Parks Group would become Boomers Parks; In addition to owning six Boomers! locations the company also owns Big Kahuna's water park in Destin, Florida and West Berlin, New Jersey.

Operating Boomers! Branded Locations

Former Boomers! Locations

References

External links
 Official website
 Palace Entertainment website
 Apex Parks Group website

1998 establishments in the United States
Amusement park companies
Palace Entertainment
Companies that filed for Chapter 11 bankruptcy in 2020